Yang Tingbao (1901–1982) was a Chinese architect and architectural educator known as one of "the Four Modern Masters in Architecture" in mainland China, along with Liang Sicheng, Tung Chuin, and Liu Dunzhen.

Education
Born in Nanyang, Henan, China, Yang entered Tsinghua College in 1915 to study architecture.

Career as an Architect

Major projects directed by Yang involved Nanjing Central Stadium, the Tsinghua University Library Addition, Heping Hotel, Southeast University (China) campus amongst others. He also took part in the design of People's Grand Hall, Beijing Train Station and the Chairman Mao Memorial. He presided, participated, or directed over 100 projects in China, mainly in Nanjing and Beijing.

Republic of China era (1912–49)

In 1927, he returned to China and joined Jitai Architecture and Engineering as a design supervisor. He worked there until 1948.
Between 1930-1931, Yang added the West and Middle side to the Tsinghua University Library, in which the East side was earlier designed by the American architect, Henry Murphy. The library was used as a wartime hospital during the Sino-Japanese War. In 1982, a second addition was designed by a professor Guan Zhaoye of Tsinghua University.

After the fourth National Athletic Games in Hangzhou in 1930, Republican President Chiang Kai-shek announced that a central stadium would be built in the capital Nanjing for the National Athletic Games in the future. In 1931, Yang Tingbao and his team won the competition for Nanjing Central Statium and construction was completed in the same year.

In 1932, Yang took part in the Historical Building Renovation Project in Beijing, where he worked closely with local craftsmen in Beijing.

People's Republic of China 1949-1982

In the early 1950s, Chinese architecture witnessed the growth of the "Large Roof Style Movement", which supporters claimed to align with Chinese tradition and to be expressive of the Chinese spirit. However, the leading critic of this movement, Liang Sicheng, ridiculed the style as: "Wearing the Western suit with a Manchurian hat."

Yang was indifferent to the fad and said: "I'm not against the Large Roof Style, but it's a waste of money. We designers shouldn't be slaves to fads and fashions." In 1952, he designed the Heping Hotel in Beijing, which was built to hold the Asia-Pacific Peace Conference. The Heping Hotel was then the first high-rise in Beijing at one story taller than Beijing Hotel. When it was built, the Heping Hotel's austere and modernistic look drew much controversy although it would later be seen as an exemplary work of public building design.

Educational career

In 1940, Yang became a professor in the architecture department of Central University. In 1949, Central University was renamed National Nanjing University, and he became the chair of its architecture department. In 1952, the architecture department and other engineering departments at Nanjing's Southwestern University were reestablished as the Nanjing Institute of Technology, which in 1988 would be renamed Southeast University. Yang subsequently remained as architecture department chair at the newly established university.

Political career

He served as vice president of the Chinese Architects Association four times, and president once. The Chinese Architects Association became affiliated with the International Union of Architects (IUA). Yang served as the vice president of the IUA between 1957 and 1963.
From 1979 to 1982, he served as the vice governor of Jiangsu Province.

Publications

Yang authored Comprehensive Hospital Architecture Design, Yang Tingbao Design Work, Yang Tingbao Watercolor, Yang Tingbao Drawing. He also wrote articles about urban planning and landscape design.

References 

1901 births
1982 deaths
Chinese architects
Educators from Henan
Members of the Chinese Academy of Sciences
Academic staff of the National Central University
People from Nanyang, Henan
Academic staff of Southeast University
Tsinghua University alumni
University of Pennsylvania School of Design alumni